Kim Su-ji (born 20 June 1987) is a South Korean volleyball player. She is a former member of the South Korea women's national volleyball team which placed fourth in the 2020 Summer Olympics and fifth in the 2016 Summer Olympics. She stepped down from the national team after the former.

She is a middle blocker. She played for Suwon Hyundai Engineering & Construction Hillstate from 2005-2014 and Incheon Heungkuk Life Pink Spiders from 2014-2017. Since 2017 she has played for Hwaseong IBK Altos. She is a childhood friend of Kim Yeon-koung.

Kim participated in:
2012 World Grand Prix
2013 the 17th Asia Women's Volleyball Championship
2014 World SR. Women's Volleyball Championship Preliminary Round
2015 The 18th Asian Sr.Women's Volleyball Championship
2015 FIVB Women's World Cup Volleyball
2016 Women's World Olympic Qualification Tournament (Japan)

References

External links

1987 births
Living people
People from Pyeongtaek
South Korean women's volleyball players
Volleyball players at the 2016 Summer Olympics
Olympic volleyball players of South Korea
Asian Games medalists in volleyball
Volleyball players at the 2018 Asian Games
Asian Games bronze medalists for South Korea
Medalists at the 2018 Asian Games
Volleyball players at the 2020 Summer Olympics